Neoniphon marianus, also known as the longjaw squirrelfish, is a species of squirrelfish found in the Western Atlantic Ocean from the Florida Keys south to Trinidad and throughout the Caribbean Sea. It is nocturnal and consumes mostly shrimps, but will also eat crabs.

References

External links
 
 
 

longjaw squirrelfish
Fish of the Caribbean
longjaw squirrelfish
Taxa named by Georges Cuvier